Tiana Cynthia Mangakahia (born 21 April 1995) is an Australian basketball player who currently plays with the Northside Wizards in the NBL1 North. She played in the United States at Syracuse University. Her U.S. college career was interrupted by a breast cancer diagnosis in 2019.

Early life
The only daughter of Terei Mangakahia, a Māori who emigrated from New Zealand to Australia in his late teens, and his Queensland-born wife Cynthia, Mangakahia grew up with five brothers, four older and one younger.  In a 2020 story, ESPN journalist Aishwarya Kumar described the young Mangakahia as "a daredevil", regularly climbing a tall pole in the family's backyard and competing in various sports and games alongside her brothers. Her older brothers all played basketball, and she was first enrolled in a basketball camp with them. Mangakahia quickly took to the sport, with Kumar noting that "Even at age 8, when she was the smallest girl on the team, she'd run and pass the ball like a ninja, nimble and fast." At age 9, she was asked to play on her club's 12-and-under team, but her mother vetoed the move. In the Kumar piece, Mangakahia herself recalled, "I think that actually helped me so much, because you never know. What if I played [up] and just sat on the bench the whole time? I probably would've not enjoyed basketball."

Career

WNBL
Mangakahia began her career, playing for the Australian Institute of Sport. After a brief stint, she then signed in her home state, with the Townsville Fire, alongside the likes of Suzy Batkovic.

National team

Youth level
Mangakahia made her international debut for the Sapphires at the 2011 FIBA Oceania Under-16 Championship in Canberra, Australia. She would once again represent the Sapphires at the 2012 Under-17 World Championship in Amsterdam, Netherlands, where Australia placed 5th. Mangakahia would then make her debut for the Gems at the FIBA Oceania Under-18 Championship, where she took home gold. She would then go on to represent the Gems at the Under-19 World Championship in Lithuania the following year, where they finished in third place and took home the bronze medal.

Senior level
In April 2019, coming off a breakout season at Syracuse, Mangakahia was named to the Opals' preliminary roster for the 2020 Summer Olympics, but was forced to bow out due to a cancer diagnosis. In July 2020, she was selected again to the Australian senior women's national team. In May 2021, she missed the women's team roster ahead of the Tokyo Olympics, which was postponed to 2021 due to the COVID-19 pandemic in Japan.

Syracuse
Mangakahia first appeared on Syracuse's recruiting radar during the lead-up to the 2013 U-19 World Championship, when Orange head coach Quentin Hillsman was serving as an assistant for the Netherlands. Hillsman recalled in 2020 that during a warm-up tournament in Europe, he told the Dutch head coach the following about Mangakahia: "If we play Australia in this tournament, we can't play man-to-man because we can't guard their point guard; she is really good. She has impeccable balance, she can get to the basket. We'd have to come up with a new plan for her." He eventually recruited her after she attended, but did not play for, Hutchinson Community College in Kansas.

She emerged as a star in her second season at Syracuse in 2018–19, averaging 16.9 points, 8.4 assists, and 4.9 rebounds while leading the Orange to a 25–9 record and a No. 3 seed, the program's highest ever, in the NCAA tournament, earning All-ACC honours and All-America honourable mention. In her first two seasons at Syracuse, Mangakahia broke the school's career record for assists and joined the team's 1,000-point club.

Cancer
Shortly after being named to the Opals' preliminary Olympic squad, Mangakahia discovered a lump on her left breast while showering. The lump grew in the following two weeks, and she was diagnosed with invasive ductal carcinoma in June 2019. While her father urged her to return to Australia for treatment, she decided to remain at Syracuse, with Hillsman promising to support her throughout her treatment. At least one of her family members travelled to Syracuse to accompany her during each of her chemotherapy sessions. When she lost her hair during her treatment, she initially wore wigs, but decided to show her bald head during her treatment; all of her brothers shaved their heads bald in solidarity with her. Eventually, Mangakahia underwent a double mastectomy followed by reconstructive surgery to improve her post-operative appearance, and was declared cancer-free shortly after the surgery. She was cleared to return to practice in late February 2020, near the end of the 2019–20 season. That October, Mangakahia received an eligibility waiver from the NCAA that allowed her to play at Syracuse in 2020–21.

Professional
Mangakahia was undrafted in the 2021 WNBA draft held on 15 April but later signed a training camp contract on the same day with the Phoenix Mercury, who later waived her on 12 May. She then went back to Australia and signed with the NBL1 North's Northside Wizards. Mangakahia also inked a contract to play for the Russian Women's Premier League's Dynamo Moscow after the NBL1 season.

Personal life
Mangakahia is a Latter-day Saint.

References

External links
Syracuse Orange bio

1995 births
Living people
Australian expatriate basketball people in the United States
Australian Institute of Sport basketball (WNBL) players
Australian Latter Day Saints
Australian people of Māori descent
Australian women's basketball players
Guards (basketball)
Sportswomen from Queensland
Syracuse Orange women's basketball players